Galway Bay FM is an Irish independent local radio station and operates under a licence from the Broadcasting Commission of Ireland. Established in 1989, the station broadcasts from studios in Galway, serving the city and County Galway.

Programming
The programming format is a mixture of music, news, sport, current affairs and local issues. Programmes are generally in English, although the station features some Irish language programmes. There is an opt-out service with alternative programming for Galway city on weekday evenings using the 95.8 MHz frequency.

History
The station was originally launched as Radio West and was the first legal local radio station in Galway. Radio West changed its name to Galway Bay FM in 1993.

In 2006, the Connacht Tribune newspaper bought the station outright, having previously owned 27% of it.

Alumni
 Gareth O'Callaghan (RTÉ 2fm, 4fm)
 Adrian Lydon (RTÉ News and Current Affairs)
 Sinéad Ní Neachtain (RTÉ Radio 1, RTÉ 2fm, TG4)
 Marc Roberts
 Keith Cunningham (Today FM,  RedFM)

References

External links
 Official website
 Galway Bay FM Live Stream

Culture in Galway (city)
1989 establishments in Ireland
Mass media in County Galway
Radio stations in the Republic of Ireland